Lotus purpureus, known as asparagus-pea or winged pea, is an annual leguminous herb native to the countries around the Mediterranean, although introduced elsewhere. It is low growing, and produces a profusion of prominent deep red flowers, followed by seed pods that are longitudinally winged. 

It is cultivated for its edible green seed pods, which are one of the vegetables known as asparagus pea or winged pea.

References

Faboideae
Plants described in 1753
Flora of Malta